Normustine, also known as bis(2-chloroethyl)carbamic acid, is a nitrogen mustard and alkylating antineoplastic agent (i.e., chemotherapy agent). It is a metabolite of a number of antineoplastic agents that have been developed for the treatment of tumors, including estramustine phosphate, alestramustine, cytestrol acetate, and ICI-85966 (stilbostat), but only the former of which has actually been marketed.

References

Alkylating antineoplastic agents
Carbamates
Human drug metabolites
Nitrogen mustards
Organochlorides
Chloroethyl compounds